Clear Creek is an unincorporated community in Perry Township, Monroe County, in the U.S. state of Indiana. It is named after the eponymous creek.

History
The post office at Clear Creek has been in operation since 1870.

Geography

See also
 Clear Creek Township, Monroe County, Indiana - located just south of Clear Creek Town, and named after the same creek.

References

Unincorporated communities in Monroe County, Indiana
Unincorporated communities in Indiana
Bloomington metropolitan area, Indiana